Tricia Rose (born October 18, 1962) is an American sociologist and author who pioneered scholarship on hip hop. Her studies mainly probe the intersectionality of pop music and gender. Now at Brown University, she is a professor of Africana Studies and is the director of the Center for Study of Race and Ethnicity in America. Rose also co-hosts a podcast, The Tight Rope, with Cornel West.

Early years and education 
Born in New York City, Rose lived in Harlem until 1970 when, at age seven, her family moved from their tenement building to Co-op City, a new and large complex of cooperative apartments in the northeast Bronx.

Rose earned a Bachelor of Arts in sociology from Yale University. Earning a PhD degree in American studies, partly under George Lipsitz, from Brown University, Rose became the first person in the United States to write a doctoral dissertation on hip hop.

Academia and authorship 
For nine years, Rose taught Africana studies at New York University. In 2002, she moved to the University of California, Santa Cruz, and in July 2003 became chair of its American Studies department.

Now at Brown University, Rose is the Chancellor's Professor of Africana Studies. And since July  2013, she has been, at Brown, the director of the Center for Study of Race and Ethnicity in America.

Rose's first book, Black Noise, emerging from her doctoral dissertation on hip hop, sparked academic recognition of this subculture's legacy. The Village Voice placed it among the top 25 books of 1994, and the Before Columbus Foundation, in 1995, gave it an American Book Award.

Books
author, Black Noise: Rap Music and Black Culture in Contemporary America (Wesleyan University Press, 1994)
author, Longing to Tell: Black Women Talk About Sexuality and Intimacy (Farrar, Straus & Giroux, 2003)
author, The Hip Hop Wars: What We Talk About When We Talk About Hip Hop—and Why It Matters (Basic Books, 2008)
contributor and, with Andrew Ross, editor, Microphone Fiends: Youth Music and Youth Culture (Routledge, 1994)

References

External links
Official website of Tricia Rose

Selected videos
Hip Hop Futures - Talk at Cornell University about the current and future state of hip hop culture
State of the Black Union 2009: Speaks about issues about the economy, hip-hop, and urban culture Part 1, Part 2
Speaks about hip hop imagery, women and exploitation in an interview
Creating Conversations on Justice, Tricia Rose at TEDxBrownUniversity

1962 births
Brown University faculty
American feminist writers
Hip hop people
Living people
African-American gender relations
Black studies scholars
Post–civil rights era in African-American history
Yale University alumni
Popular culture studies
Gender studies academics
American Book Award winners
People from Co-op City, Bronx
People from Harlem
Brown University alumni
American women podcasters
American podcasters